Lamar County is a county located in the U.S. state of Texas, in the Northeast Texas region. As of the 2020 census, its population was 50,088. Its county seat is Paris. The county was formed by the Congress of the Republic of Texas on December 17, 1840, and organized the next year. It is named for Mirabeau Buonaparte Lamar, the second president of the Republic of Texas. Lamar County comprises the Paris, TX micropolitan statistical area.

Geography

Major highways
  U.S. Highway 82
  U.S. Highway 271
  State Highway 19
  State Highway 24
  Loop 286

Adjacent counties
 Choctaw County, Oklahoma (north)
 Red River County (east)
 Delta County (south)
 Fannin County (west)
 Bryan County, Oklahoma (northwest)

Communities

Cities

 Blossom
 Deport (partly in Red River County)
 Paris (county seat and largest municipality)
 Reno
 Roxton
 Sun Valley
 Toco

Census-designated place
 Powderly

Unincorporated communities

 Ambia
 Arthur City
 Atlas
 Brookston
 Chicota
 Cunningham
 Glory
 Hopewell
 Midcity
 Milton
 Pattonville
 Petty
 Sumner

Demographics

Note: the US Census treats Hispanic/Latino as an ethnic category. This table excludes Latinos from the racial categories and assigns them to a separate category. Hispanics/Latinos can be of any race.

As of the census of 2000, 48,499 people, 19,077 households, and 13,468 families resided in the county. At the tabulation of the 2020 United States census, its population increased to 50,088.

Among the population, its racial and ethnic makeup was 70.58% non-Hispanic white, 12.73% Black or African American, 1.50% American Indian and Alaska Native, 0.95% Asian alone, 0.05% Native Hawaiian or other Pacific Islander, 0.24% some other race alone, 5.14% multiracial, and 8.81% Hispanic or Latino American of any race. In 2000, the racial makeup of the county was 82.46% White, 13.47% African American, 1.08% Native American, 0.40% Asian, 1.19% from other races, and 1.41% from two or more races. About 3.33% of the population was Hispanic or Latino of any race; from 2000 to 2020, the majority if its population remained predominantly non-Hispanic white against nationwide demographic trends of increased diversification.

Education
These school districts serve Lamar County:
 Chisum ISD (small portion in Delta County)
 Fannindel ISD (mostly in Delta and Fannin Counties; small portion in Hunt County)
 Honey Grove ISD (mostly in Fannin County)
 North Lamar ISD
 Paris ISD
 Prairiland ISD (small portion in Red River County)
Until it closed in 2019, Roxton ISD. Roxton ISD consolidated into Chisum ISD after the 2018–19 school year.

In addition, Paris Junior College serves the county.

Politics
The majority-white population supported the Democratic Party well into the late 20th century, when it was nearly a one-party state, but in the early 21st century, most have shifted to the Republican Party. Lamar County is now represented in the Texas House of Representatives by Gary VanDeaver of New Boston.

See also

 National Register of Historic Places listings in Lamar County, Texas
 Recorded Texas Historic Landmarks in Lamar County
 Lamar County Historical Museum

References

External links

 Lamar County government's website
 Lamar County in Handbook of Texas Online at the University of Texas
  Historic Lamar County materials, hosted by the Portal to Texas History
 Lamar County Texas information - Lamar County Station

 
1841 establishments in the Republic of Texas
Populated places established in 1841